The 2022 African Rhythmic Gymnastics Championships also known as The 16th African Championships was held from 17 to 19 June 2022 in Cairo, Egypt.

Medal winners

Senior

Team

Individual

Group

References 

2022 in Egyptian sport
2022 in gymnastics
Gymnastics in Egypt
African Rhythmic Gymnastics
African Rhythmic Gymnastics Championships